Mother Father Brother Sister is Misia's debut album, released on June 24, 1998. It debuted at #3 on the weekly albums chart with 330,660 copies sold. The album stayed in the Top 3 the next two weeks and on its fourth week, reached the top of the charts with 277,990 copies sold. The album remained in the Top 5 for eleven consecutive weeks and sold over 2.58 million copies in Japan alone. It won the award for Best Album at the 40th Japan Record Awards.

As well as being Misia's highest-selling album, Mother Father Brother Sister is also the 7th best-selling debut album and 37th best-selling album of all time in Japan.

Track listing

Charts

Oricon sales chart

References

External links
Misia Official Web Site

1998 debut albums
Misia albums
Japanese-language albums
Albums produced by Shirō Sagisu